Krzysztof Włosik (born 28 April 1957) is a Polish archer. He competed in the men's individual event at the 1980 Summer Olympics.

References

1957 births
Living people
Polish male archers
Olympic archers of Poland
Archers at the 1980 Summer Olympics
Sportspeople from Kraków